Palisades Corner is an unincorporated community in Payette County, Idaho, United States, roughly  south of Fruitland.

See also

References

Unincorporated communities in Idaho
Unincorporated communities in Payette County, Idaho